Kyllinga melanosperma is a species of sedge, covered with dark brown scales that culm together to form rhizomes that are about  long. Kyllinga melanosperma is found in tropical Africa, southern and southeastern Asia. Kyllinga melanosperma propagates by seed.

References

melanosperma
Plants described in 1834